Franciszek Brodniewicz (29 November 1892 – 17 August 1944) was a Polish actor. He died during the Warsaw Uprising.

Filmography
 Dymitr Samozwaniec as Sigismund III Vasa (1922)
 Prokurator Alicja Horn as Jan Winkler (1933)
 Śluby ułańskie as Gończa (1934)
 Black Pearl as Rena's husband (1934)
 Córka generała Pankratowa as Bolesław (1934)
 Dzień wielkiej przygody (1935)
 Dwie Joasie as lawyer Rostalski (1935)
 Trędowata as Waldemar Michorowski (1936)
 Pan Twardowski as Twardowski (1936)
 Wierna rzeka as Wiesnicyn (1936)
 Augustus the Strong (1936)
 Mały marynarz as Franciszek Nowicki (1936)
 Daddy Gets Married as Robert Viscont) (1936)
 Ułan księcia Józefa as Józef Poniatowski (1937)
 Ordynat Michorowski as Waldemar Michorowski (1937)
 Wrzos as Andrzej Sanicki (1938)
 Moi rodzice rozwodzą się as Jerzy Sławomir (1938)
 U kresu drogi as hrabia Wiktor Łański (1939)
 Doctor Murek as Doctor Murek (1939)
 Przez łzy do szczęścia as Jan Monkiewicz (1941)

Bibliography
 Skaff, Sheila. The Law of the Looking Glass: Cinema in Poland, 1896-1939. Ohio University Press, 2008.

External links

1892 births
1944 deaths
Burials at Bródno Cemetery
Polish male film actors
Polish male silent film actors
20th-century Polish male actors
Polish civilians killed in World War II